Prentiss Waggner (born June 28, 1990) is an American football cornerback who is currently a free agent. He played college football at Tennessee.

Early years
Waggner attended and played high school football at Clinton High School in Clinton, Louisiana.

College career
Waggner attended the University of Tennessee from 2008–2012 under head coaches Phillip Fulmer, Lane Kiffin, and Derek Dooley. He redshirted in the 2008 season. In the 2009 season, he appeared in 13 games. He had one assisted tackle in the game against Memphis on November 7. He had five total tackles in the game against Ole Miss on November 14. In the 2010 season, he had a larger role on the defense. He had a 54-yard interception return for a touchdown in the season opener against Tennessee-Martin. He had a nine-yard interception return for a touchdown against UAB on September 25. He had two fumble recoveries in the game against Memphis on November 6. He had a 10-yard interception return for a touchdown against Ole Miss on November 13. On the 2010 season, he totaled 57 total tackles, two tackles-for-loss, nine passes defensed, five interceptions, three pick-sixes, and two fumble recoveries. In the 2011 season, he had 48 total tackles, three tackles-for-loss, two sacks, two interceptions, nine passes defensed, and a forced fumble. In the 2012 season, he had 48 total tackles, two tackles-for-loss, two interceptions, six passes defensed, and one forced fumble.

Professional career
Waggner went undrafted in the 2013 NFL Draft. He was signed by the Arizona Cardinals on April 29, 2013. He was later cut by the team on May 14.

References

External links
Tennessee Volunteers biography
NFL entry

1990 births
Living people
African-American players of American football
Players of American football from Louisiana
American football cornerbacks
Tennessee Volunteers football players
Arizona Cardinals players
21st-century African-American sportspeople